Public transport in Christchurch, New Zealand, consists of bus services operated by two bus companies supported by a ferry, all jointly marketed as Metro.

Overview
Since deregulation of the urban bus market in 1991, the Canterbury Regional Council (now branded Environment Canterbury) has taken responsibility for the tendering, planning and administration of public transport in Christchurch. Over the course of that time, improvements and changes have shaped the predominantly bus based public transport system, including the introduction of services such as the Orbiter. Originally branded as CanRide, this was replaced in 2003 with the introduction of the Metro brand and the eventual Metrocard.

Ticketing and fares are, with some exceptions, standard across the city's network. The electronic Metrocard provides a discount off regular fares. Under 18s receive a discount, and senior citizens travel free on off-peak services (9:00am to 3:00pm and after 6:30pm weekdays, all day weekends and public holidays).

'Real-time' bus arrival times are displayed on electronic displays at bus stops, online and mobile (cellphone) WAP.

The February 2011 Christchurch earthquake resulted in significant changes to the Metro bus network with the two key changes. The first change was the removal and or reorganisation of many routes due to the closure of the central city, road damage along routes, or reduced patronage. The second change occurred in December 2012 with the shift of the bus network from a radial network to a hub and spoke model network and the Blue Line was introduced. This resulted in many services being localised to hubs with connecting core services into the Central City and Cross Town.

More changes were made in December 2014, with the introduction of the Purple Line, Yellow Line and Orange Line, and more suburb to suburb routes.

Operations

The local bus service is marketed as Metro and designed, specified, put out to tender and subsidised by Environment Canterbury. All bus operators are required to display the required external Metro branding to vehicles under contract to ECan.

Christchurch City Council provides roading infrastructure and street furniture such as signs and seats and regulates parking at bus stops, and is also owner of Red Bus Ltd through its holding company Christchurch City Holdings. The city council previously funded the zero-fare The Shuttle service which ended after the 2011 earthquake.

The Christchurch City Council also provides bus lanes which operational during peak commuting hours on some routes. The routes have been controversial with some business owners concerned at the loss of parking from outside their businesses during the lanes operational times, but the lanes have improved bus travel times, schedule adherence and have resulted in an increase in passenger numbers.

Vehicle safety standards are regulated by the NZ Transport Agency.

Bus interchange

2000–2011 
The city council provided the previous central city bus exchange in November 2000, which was damaged and closed after the earthquake on 22 February 2011. The previous bus exchange in the city centre served as the principal bus interchange point and passenger hub for the Metro network. The Exchange had attracted interest from other worldwide city authorities investigating how to improve their bus services. Since the Bus Exchange opened in 2000, the number of people using the bus service had doubled.

2011–2015 
With the closure of the central city, two separate temporary central city facilities on the outer fringes of the CBD were established; one in Bealey Avenue, and one in Hagley Avenue. On 25 October 2011, bus services shifted to the new Central Station between Lichfield and Tuam Streets (in the block between Colombo and Durham Streets), which served as a longer-term temporary city bus stop. The expectation was that Central Station was to be in use for "up to two years".

2015 Bus interchange

Opening 
The Christchurch Central Recovery Plan of the Canterbury Earthquake Recovery Authority (CERA) was unveiled on 30 July 2012, which had an indicative time-frame for a new Bus Interchange building to be open by June 2014. Central Station was in use until 25 May 2015, when Christchurch's new $53 million Bus Interchange building opened,  with half of the 16 bays operational. On 20 August, the building was physically completed and further opened to the public, including bike parking and more seating. On Thursday 8 October, the remaining bays opened. Later retailers took spaces.

Services 
Part of the hub and spoke model network is that many passengers need to interchange to other buses at suburban centres. The four High Frequency services, which cross the city every 10 to 15 minutes, serve the Interchange, but the Orbiter doesn't. The Interchange also provides for the less frequent buses, longer distance coaches (on Lichfield St, except for Newmans to Queenstown), taxis, cyclists and pedestrians.

Design 
Architectus and Aurecon designed the interchange and Thiess and Southbase Construction built it.

The passenger hall has underfloor heating from a groundwater heat pump. Wind towers and louvres draw air into the hall and air curtains prevent fumes getting in. Each bus route has an area within the interchange, buses being automatically directed to a stop in that area. Doors to the hall open once the bus stops and another door at the front allows cyclists to access bus bike racks. Although pedestrians aren't permitted in the bus manoeuvering area, bus speeds are restricted. Cycle racks for 100 bicycles are on two levels and there are e-bike chargers. There are also toilets, luggage lockers and an information counter. Tactile paving guides sight impaired passengers. A large canopy and verandas provide shelter outside.

Riccarton Road lounge 
The first bus lounge, which provides indoor waiting facilities, was planned for Riccarton Road. ECan requested it to be open in December 2014, but Christchurch city councillors found it difficult to make the required decisions. The opening was initially delayed to April 2015, and the city council then gave itself a new deadline of August 2015, and then said it would be open in November 2015. It wasn't until 14 December 2015 that the Riccarton Road lounge, on the corner with Division Street, finally opened.

Bus services

On 8 December 2014, a new bus network was launched offering three types of bus services. Five colour-coded frequent bus routes (the High Frequency Services) run through Christchurch's major road corridors, connecting people to popular destinations. In September, 2020 it was announced that the colour-coded line branding will be discontinued, with lines reverting to their routes number. The Blue Line group became routes 1 and 1x on 28 September, the rest will change over in November 2020. 

City Connectors (buses with two numbers, not including route 97) allow people to travel from outer suburbs and satellite towns direct to the city.

Suburban Links (buses with three numbers and also route 97) allow people to travel between inner suburbs, while avoiding the central city. People wanting to go to the Bus Interchange would need to transfer onto another bus at transfer points, located throughout the city.

The following services are operated under the Metro brand:

High Frequency Services

City Connector services

Suburban Link services

Bikes on buses

Christchurch was the first place in New Zealand where bikes were carried on suburban buses. The trial started in November 2007 on the 35 route to Heathcote. Bike racks on buses are provided on all suburban services.

Other transport services

Taxis
There are a variety of taxi operators active in Christchurch. Operations are regulated by the New Zealand Transport Agency.

Airport transport
Christchurch International Airport is served by buses and shuttle vans.

 Three bus routes are available from the airport bus stand located outside the International Arrivals Terminal;
 3 Airport or Sheffield Crescent to Sumner
 29 City to Airport via Fendalton
 125 Redwood to Westlake
 Shuttle vans provided by several operators, including most taxi companies, provide door-to-door transport to and from the Airport.

Diamond Harbour ferry
A ferry connects the suburb of Lyttelton to Diamond Harbour, a settlement on the opposite side of Lyttelton Harbour. Ferries first began crossing Lyttelton Harbour in 1888. The ferry is operated by Black Cat Ltd. Connection provided with metro routes 28 and 155.

Christchurch Tramway

Christchurch Tramway Ltd operates a one-way tram circuit of the central city. This is mainly marketed as a tourist attraction, but is available to local commuters with an annual season ticket. Trams were originally introduced to Christchurch in 1905, ceased operating in 1954, and returned to the newly built inner city loop in 1995, mainly as a tourist attraction.

Preliminary investigation into light rail options for Christchurch was made in 2009. Investigating options and protecting possible routes is an action point in the City Council's "A City for People Action Plan" (approved in 2010).

Heavy rail 

Commuter rail service was discontinued in the 1970s, while long distance rail travel (by KiwiRail) has been scaled back to just the Coastal Pacific and TranzAlpine services, which depart from the Christchurch Train Station in Addington.

In May 2014, an article on the website Stuff.co.nz stated that the Templeton Residents' Association had urged Christchurch City Council to consider the implementation of a local commuter rail network for the city. In an article dated August 2014, it was subsequently confirmed that the city council were to discuss the possibility with the NZ Transport Agency.

References

External links

 Red Bus website
 Metro website